The first season of Teenage Mutant Ninja Turtles is the first season of the series aired in syndication.  At this point in the series, the Technodrome is located underneath New York City. Chronologically, this is the 5-part pilot episode, "Heroes in a Half Shell".

Episodes
 All five first-season episodes were written by David Wise and Patti Howeth

Notes
In late 1989 the first five episodes from series 1 were adapted in a 50-minute video special called The Epic Begins (also known as How It All Began) released by Family Home Entertainment in the US and Tempo Video/Abbey Home Entertainment in the UK (with the British title called Teenage Mutant HERO Turtles). The footage from this season was taken from a third-season clip show called Blast From The Past, and this was amalgamated with various series 2 episodes.

The five episodes were later adapted into the first three issue miniseries of Teenage Mutant Ninja Turtles Adventures by Archie Comics under the name Heroes in a Half-Shell. This adaptation would be collected into one book and published under the name Heroes in a Half-Shell: The Complete Adventure by Random House Publishing in 1989, coupled with a cassette featuring an audio play performed by an uncredited voice cast.

These five episodes, along with the opening, were animated by Toei Animation Studios.

Reception

References

External links

TV Com

Teenage Mutant Ninja Turtles (1987 TV series) seasons
1987 American television seasons
1988 American television seasons
Television miniseries as pilots
1980s American television miniseries